Usanee Laopinkarn is a Thai athlete. She won gold medals in the 200 metres and in the  relay and a bronze medal in the individual 100 meters in the 1978 Asian Games.

References

Athletes (track and field) at the 1978 Asian Games
Usanee Laopinkarn
Usanee Laopinkarn
Usanee Laopinkarn
Asian Games medalists in athletics (track and field)
Medalists at the 1978 Asian Games
Living people
Year of birth missing (living people)
Usanee Laopinkarn
Southeast Asian Games medalists in athletics
Usanee Laopinkarn